The Bondi Surf Bathers' Life Saving Club is Australia's oldest Surf Life Saving Club, founded in 1907.  The club was officially established on 21 February 1907 at the Royal Hotel in Bondi Beach, Sydney, New South Wales. The clubs aim is to ensure "No Lives Lost" at Bondi Beach and is a volunteer organisation that patrols Bondi Beach from October to April every year.

History 
On 13 November 1902, two policemen attended Bondi and started taking names of those dressed in ‘small trunks’. The Rector of St Mary's, Waverley, and a Mr Frank McElhone, were apprehended by the police for bathing outside the permitted hours .    This article notes people had been bathing for ’20 years’.   The Inspector General of Police said “So long as bathers wear suitable costumes, and public decency is not outraged, I am unable to see that a practice permitted for so many years should be stopped. Indeed, I do not suppose that the magistrates would inflict penalties for any breach of the Act under the circumstances. Unless, therefore, I receive instructions from the Government to the contrary I do not see my way to take action beyond instructing the police that decency is to be observed.”

As the laws were relaxed, more and more people chose to swim in the ocean, and it became obvious that they needed to be protected from the strong currents and rips.  Between November 1902 and February 1907, at many Sydney beaches, a number of groups started with a view to protecting beachgoers.

By January 1907, Bondi lifesavers were making rescues such as the one on 2 January 1907 of Chas Smith and another 9-year-old boy.  Later this would become the myth that Chas became Charles Kingsford Smith – it is true he was about that age and based in Sydney in 1907, but there is no other proof that this is true.

Both Manly Surf Club and Bronte Surf Lifesaving Club also make claim to be the ‘first life saving club’, but there are no primary sources for these claims.    Bronte's claim is based on an affidavit made in 1931 that they were first, and some meeting minutes in 1907 which stated that it was the 4th AGM – but there are no documents to verify either of these.  This may be due to confusion as the Bronte Surf Bathing Association President sent a letter to the Sydney Morning Herald on 8 May 1907 saying “this association has lately formed, or is now forming, a brigade consisting of strong surf swimmers, and known as the Bronte Surf Life Brigade.” and a second article the same day in the Evening News states “The Bronte Surf -Bathing Association is about to establish a life-saving brigade.”  This “Bronte Surf Brigade” later became Bronte SLSC.

SLSA historians reviewed all claims in 2005 and stated they recognise Bondi as the first surf life saving club.  They stated “A hardly perennial in surf lifesaving history is the question of the first surf club — Bondi or Bronte. As this study has shown, the first group of organised lifesavers formed on Manly Beach in 1899. While moves on Bondi, Bronte and Manly in early 1907 saw the organisation of irregulars, it was the surf bathers of Bondi who first organised themselves as a formal club in February 1907."

Until that time Bondi believed for 50 or more years that it had formed in February 1906 – hence you will find many images of “established 1906” and references to February 1906 in incorrect histories. Based on the research, Bondi resolved in 2006 to change all foundation dates to recognise the accurate information.

Bondi Surf Bathers Life Saving Club was formed at a meeting at the Royal Hotel, Bondi Junction, on 21 February 1907.

This was documented in formal Minutes of the meeting (copy held at Waverley Library) and a letter from the library confirming receipt at the time.

The club then hosted some displays in March 1907.  Bondi Life Savers were in full action by the time of this “Plucky rescue” in September 1907  and had saved 34 people over the first full season.

By 1910 both Bondi Surf Bathers Life Saving Club and Bondi Surf and Social Club (changed to North Bondi Surf Life Saving Club in 1911) were building up membership and awareness.  The Surf Line and Belt (commonly called the ‘Reel’) is the logo of the Bondi Surf Club as Lyster Ormsby invented this life saving device.  He fashioned a model “contrived from hair pins and a cotton reel” and took it to the firm of Olding and Parker, coachbuilders, who from it fashioned a surf reel which was displayed and used on Bondi Beach, on 23 December 1906. It allowed a swimmer to reach a patient and then the crew on the beach could pull them back to the beach. It required discipline and control to carry this out efficiently. While lifesaving competitions still include the use of the reel, it was phased out of active service for rescues in 1994 – now ‘Rubber Duckies’ and Boards carry out most rescues.

On 10 October 1907 the Surf Bathing Association of NSW (SBANSW) was founded with nine clubs and affiliated associations. The nine foundation clubs were Royal Life Saving Society, Manly Surf Club, Bondi Surf Bathers' Life Saving Club, Coogee Surf Life Brigade (now Coogee Surf Life Saving Club), Bronte Surf Brigade (now Bronte Surf Lifesaving Club), Bondi Surf and Social Club (now North Bondi Surf Life Saving Club), Tamarama Surf Club (disbanded and replaced by Tamarama Surf Life Saving Club), Maroubra Surf Club (now Maroubra Surf Life Saving Club), United Wanderers Surf Club and Woollahra Surf Club.

The first duty roster was drawn up in August 1908, and a test swim as a prerequisite for club membership was introduced that September.

The first Bronze Medallion squad was examined at Bondi Beach on 2 January 1910. It comprised four members of the Bondi SBLSC and the Coogee Life Saving Brigade.

As a result of a visit to Tweed Heads by the Bondi Baths Life Saving Club, a number of young men at Tweed Heads and Coolangatta formed a surf club on 12 April 1909, at Greenmount Beach, under the title of the Tweed Heads Surf and Life Saving Club. This was the pioneer club of the Surf Life Saving movement in Queensland.

On 6 February 1938, three giant waves washed out to sea hundreds of swimmers in a day remembered as Black Sunday. 200 were rescued by the club's lifesavers, 5 died, and 35 were resuscitated. The dramatic event was reenacted 80 years later in 2018. In November 1965, the Club created its Nippers group.

Competition 
Bondi is the 2018  & 2017 Australian Masters Champions in the Australian Titles and 2017 Australian Pool Rescue Championships. 
Bondi has won more SLSA Premierships than any other club.  Notably 1914/1915, 1921/22, 1922/23, 1923/24, 1925/26, 1928/29, 1921/32, 1934/35, 1937/38, 1939/40, 1971/72, 1989/90, 1991/92, 2006/06 & 2007/08.  This number of wins is unique to the club.

See also

Bondi Beach Cultural Landscape
Surf lifesaving
Surf Life Saving Australia
List of Australian surf lifesaving clubs

References

External links
 

1907 establishments in Australia
Sports clubs established in 1907
Surf Life Saving Australia clubs
Sporting clubs in Sydney
Bondi, New South Wales